The Communist Party of Canada fielded several candidates in the 1988 federal election, none of whom were elected.  Information about these candidates may be found on this page.

Quebec

Papineau—Saint-Michel: Line Chabot
Line Chabot was a Communist Party candidate in two federal elections and one provincial election. She described herself as a bookseller in 1984.

Ontario

Geoffrey Da Silva (Eglinton—Lawrence)

Da Silva received 208 votes (0.52%), finishing fifth against Liberal candidate Joe Volpe.  He later became a cabinet minister in Guyana.

Mike Phillips (Sudbury)

Mike Phillips was a perennial candidate for the Communist Party at the federal and provincial levels.  He was a 24-year-old electrician during his first campaign, and later worked as a labour reporter for the Canadian Tribune.

John (Jack) C. Sweet (York West)

Sweet was a toolmaker, administrator and IBM clerk in private life, and was a perennial candidate for federal, provincial and municipal office in North York.  He joined the Communist Party at age eighteen and was a member for more than fifty years, working for a time in the organization's Toronto headquarters.

Sweet contributed to "Canadian Aid for Russia" in 1943, during World War II.  He was president of Toronto's Tim Buck-Norman Bethune Education Centre during the 1980s.  A dedicated community activist, he was also president of the Humberlea Community Association and chairman of a Metro tax reform council.  He opposed an expansion of Pearson International Airport in 1989.

He was listed as sixty-six years old during the 1984 campaign.

The closest he ever came to winning election was in 1978, when he was narrowly defeated for a North York school trustee position.

References